Popy Hazarika (born 8 December 1998) is an Indian weightlifter.  She won a Silver medal at 2021 Commonwealth Weightlifting Championships in Tashkent.  In July 2022 she placed Seventh in the women's 59 kg weightlifting event at the 2022 Commonwealth Games. She works in the Indian Railway.

References

1998 births
Living people
Indian female weightlifters
Weightlifters at the 2022 Commonwealth Games
Commonwealth Games competitors for India
21st-century Indian women